Dawn is an unincorporated community in eastern Deaf Smith County, Texas, United States.  It lies along FM 809 northeast of the city of Hereford, the county seat of Deaf Smith County.  Its elevation is 3,802 feet (1,159 m).  Although Dawn is unincorporated, it has a post office, with the ZIP code of 79025; the ZCTA for ZIP Code 79025 had a population of 138 at the 2000 census.

Dawn was founded by local rancher Jim Moore in 1887; it was named by a shopkeeper who bought the land two years later, but the reason for calling it "Dawn" is disputed.  The community flourished in the 1890s, when it received its first schools and railroad line.  The community's schools were consolidated with the Hereford district in 1963.

Bluegrass musicians Smokey Mayfield (1924-2008) and Thomas Edd Mayfield (1926-1958) were born in Dawn. A third Mayfield brother, Herbert Mayfield (1920-2008), lived in Dawn as a young boy until his family moved to Dimmitt, the seat of Castro County, in 1931.

References

External links
Profile of Dawn from the Handbook of Texas Online

Unincorporated communities in Deaf Smith County, Texas
Unincorporated communities in Texas